This is a list of all present sovereign states in Asia and their predecessors. The boundaries of Asia are culturally determined, as there is no clear geographical separation between it and Europe, which together form one continuous landmass called Eurasia. The most commonly accepted boundaries place Asia to the east of the Suez Canal, the Ural River, and the Ural Mountains, and south of the Caucasus Mountains (or the Kuma–Manych Depression) and the Caspian and Black Seas.

See also
List of sovereign states and dependent territories in Asia
Decolonisation of Asia
Succession of states

References

Asia
Former countries in Asia
Asia-related lists
History of Asia